Liar Liar is a 1997 American legal comedy film, directed by Tom Shadyac and written by Paul Guay and Stephen Mazur. It stars Jim Carrey as a lawyer who built his entire career on lying but finds himself cursed to speak only the truth for a single day, during which he struggles to maintain his career and to reconcile with his ex-wife and son whom he alienated with his pathological lying.

The film is the second of three collaborations between Carrey and Shadyac—the first being Ace Ventura: Pet Detective and the third being Bruce Almighty—the second of three collaborations between Guay and Mazur—the others being The Little Rascals and Heartbreakers—and the first collaboration between Carrey and producer Brian Grazer.

The film was released to critical and commercial success, grossing $302.7 million against a budget of $45 million and earning positive reviews from critics and audiences, who particularly praised Carrey's performance. At the 56th Golden Globe Awards, he was nominated for Best Actor in a Comedy.

Plot

Fletcher Reede is a lawyer and divorced father living in Los Angeles. He loves spending time with his young son, Max; they often play a game where Fletcher makes his hand into "the Claw", with which he tickles Max and pretends to chase him. However, Fletcher has a habit of giving precedence to his career, breaking promises to Max and his ex-wife, Audrey, and then lying about the reasons. Fletcher's compulsive lying has also built him a reputation as a successful defense lawyer at his firm. On Max's birthday, Fletcher misses his party when senior partner Miranda lures him to get promoted by having sex in the office. Max makes a birthday wish that Fletcher would be unable to tell a lie for an entire day—a wish that immediately becomes true.

Fletcher soon discovers, through a series of embarrassing incidents, that he is unable to lie, mislead or withhold the truth. This goes so far as his body restraining him from writing a false statement. These incidents are inconvenient, ranging from being dumped by Miranda after his honest review about their one night stand; alienating his secretary, Greta, when she realizes his law practices have hampered true justice; having his car impounded when he confesses to a policeman all his traffic infractions and unpaid tickets; and his inability to bend the truth in court. His current client is Samantha Cole, a gold digger who wants a net sum from her soon-to-be ex-husband, Richard Cole. The main witness, Kenneth Falk, with whom Samantha has been cheating, is eager to commit perjury to win. However, Fletcher cannot ask questions if the respondent will lie. Meanwhile, Audrey is planning to move to Boston with her fiancé, Jerry, and decides to take Max with them to protect him from the disappointment Fletcher causes him when he breaks his promises.

Fletcher tries desperately to delay the case, even beating himself up, but is unable to lie his way into a continuance. Knowing that he cannot deny the proof of Samantha's adultery, he successfully disputes the validity of her prenuptial agreement after accidentally discovering that she had signed it as a minor without parental consent. This entitles Samantha to 50% of Richard's marital assets, equal to $11.395 million, affording Fletcher to win the case truthfully. However, Samantha also insists on contesting custody of their children for an extra $10,000 in monthly child support payments from Richard. A disheartened Fletcher, realizing that he had corrupted Samantha with his own lies, watches as she pulls her crying children out of Richard's arms. Horrified by his actions, Fletcher demands that the judge reverse the decision, but his attitude angers the judge and he is arrested for contempt of court. Fletcher calls Audrey to bail him out, but she informs him that their plane leaves for Boston that night. Greta learns of this and, having realized Fletcher turned over a new leaf, pays his bail.

Recognizing Max as his highest priority, Fletcher rushes to the airport, but Audrey and Max's plane has already left the gate. In desperation, he hijacks a mobile stairway to pursue the plane onto the runway. After throwing one of his shoes at the plane's windshield, it finally stops, but Fletcher is injured after he crashes the mobile stairway. On a stretcher, Fletcher vows to Max that he will spend more time with him. He says that despite he is free to lie now that the 24 hours have elapsed, it feels better to be honest. Max believes him, and Audrey decides to remain in California.

One year later, Fletcher has started his own small firm with Greta. He and Audrey are celebrating Max's birthday. Max makes a birthday wish, only to find that Fletcher and Audrey are kissing. Fletcher asks Max if he wished for them to get back together, but Max says he only wished for roller blades. The family returns to normal as Fletcher chases Audrey and Max around the house with "the Claw".

Cast

In addition to portraying Fletcher Reede, Carrey has a cameo appearance as Fire Marshall Bill at the end of the film, seeing to Reede's injuries after he crashes a mobile stairway, reprising his role from In Living Color. Liar Liar was the film debut of actress Sara Paxton, who played one of Max's classmates who attends his birthday party. It was also the last film to feature Don Keefer, who retired in 1997 before he died in 2014, and Jason Bernard, who died shortly after filming was completed. The film was dedicated in Bernard's memory.

Production
The original script treatment, first penned by Paul Guay and Stephen Mazur in 1994, revolved around a scummy real estate agent who lies to clients about houses, and it was written to be a potential vehicle for Steve Martin. It was later rewritten by an uncredited Judd Apatow to involve a lawyer, meant for a younger actor "no older than 35", such as Jim Carrey, Mike Myers, or Eddie Murphy. Myers turned it down to instead do Austin Powers: International Man of Mystery, while Carrey turned down that film to instead do Liar Liar, on the condition that frequent collaborator and friend Tom Shadyac could direct. Meanwhile, Twister actor Cary Elwes was cast "by chance" when he ran into Carrey and Shadyac in Hollywood, California; when he asked what they were up to, Carrey responded with "we're about to make a new movie, you wanna be in it?" Elwes agreed on the spot without reading the script.

The film began in development, including principal photography, on July 8 - October 16, 1996. It was filmed in Los Angeles, California.

In an interview, Carrey said filming the movie was very physically demanding on him, "because it was this constant suppression of angst, completely freaking out all the time. I would go home with total exhaustion". According to Carrey, over "a million feet" of film tape was wasted due to people uncontrollably laughing at Carrey's improv.

Reception

Box office
The film is the second of three Carrey/Shadyac collaborations, all of which did extremely well at the box office: the opening weekend made $31,423,025 in 2,845 theaters. It was the second-highest, three-day opener ever for Universal Studios, only coming second to Jurassic Park. For five years, it had the largest March opening weekend until it was taken by Ice Age in 2002. It stayed at the top of the box office for three weeks before being overtaken by Anaconda. In North America, it made $181,410,615, and at the box office in other territories it made $121,300,000 for a total of $302,710,615.

Critical response
The film received positive reviews from critics. On Rotten Tomatoes, it has a rating of 82%, based on 62 reviews, with an average rating of 6.90/10. The site's critical consensus reads, "Despite its thin plot, Liar Liar is elevated by Jim Carrey's exuberant brand of physical humor, and the result is a laugh riot that helped to broaden the comedian's appeal." On Metacritic, it has a score of 70 out of 100, based on 20 critics, indicating "generally favorable reviews." Audiences polled by CinemaScore gave it an "A−" grade from an A+ to F scale.

Roger Ebert of the Chicago Sun-Times gave the film three out of four stars and stated, "I am gradually developing a suspicion, or perhaps it is a fear, that Jim Carrey is growing on me," as he had given negative reviews to his previous films Dumb and Dumber and Ace Ventura: Pet Detective.

Some critics noted similarities between the plot with that of an episode of The Twilight Zone entitled "The Whole Truth" where a used-car salesman comes into ownership of a car that is haunted and forces him to tell the truth so long as he owns it. In particular, one scene that bears a resemblance to an element used in Liar Liar is the part where the salesman's assistant asks for a raise, and he is compelled to come clean that there is no raise.

Year-end lists
American Film Institute recognition:
 AFI's 100 Years...100 Laughs – Nominated

Home media

The film was released for VHS and Laserdisc on September 30, 1997, by Universal Studios Home Video. The DVD was released on January 20, 1998, in full screen format. DTS Full Screen and Collector's Edition Widescreen versions were also released on DVD the following year. The Blu-ray with Multi-Format (including a Digital Copy and UltraViolet) was released on July 9, 2013. It was also released on the 1990s Best of the Decade Edition on Blu-ray and re-released on October 16, 2018. A new DVD was re-released on May 10, 2016, by Universal Pictures Home Entertainment. A remastered 25th Anniversary edition was released on Blu-ray through Shout! Factory on January 18, 2022.

References

External links

 
 
 
 
 
 

1990s fantasy comedy films
1990s legal films
1997 comedy films
1997 films
American fantasy comedy films
American legal films
American courtroom films
1990s English-language films
Films about father–son relationships
Films scored by John Debney
Films about dysfunctional families
Films about lawyers
Films about lying
Films about wish fulfillment
Films directed by Tom Shadyac
Films produced by Brian Grazer
Films set in Los Angeles
Films shot in California
Imagine Entertainment films
Legal comedy films
Magic realism films
Universal Pictures films
1990s American films